George Park may refer to:

 George Park (politician) (1914–1994), British Labour Party politician
 George Park (swimmer), Canadian swimmer
 George S. Park (1811–1890), Texas War of Independence hero and founder of Parkville, Missouri, Park University and Manhattan, Kansas
 George Eamon Park (1916–1975), Member of the Provincial Parliament of Ontario
 George John Park (1880–1977), New Zealand teacher and technical college principal
 George Watt Park (1853–1935), American horticulturist and businessman
 George Winter Park (1834–1901), American politician in the Massachusetts House of Representatives